G with turned comma above right (uppercase Gʻ, lowercase gʻ) is the 26th letter of the Uzbek Latin alphabet, representing the voiced uvular fricative . It was adopted in the  revision of the alphabet, replacing Ğ. It was also used for the same sound in the Karakalpak alphabet until 2016, when it was replaced with Ǵ. It corresponds to Cyrillic Ғ.

Encodings

See also
 Ğ
 Ghayn (Cyrillic)

References

Latin letters with diacritics
Uzbek language